Sajiro Miyama (born 20 January 1917) is a Japanese boxer who competed in the 1936 Summer Olympics. He was born in Nagoya.

In 1936 he was eliminated in the first round of the featherweight class after losing his fight to Arquímedes Arrieta of Uruguay.

External links

References

1917 births
Sportspeople from Nagoya
Featherweight boxers
Olympic boxers of Japan
Boxers at the 1936 Summer Olympics
Japanese male boxers
20th-century Japanese people